Heyden's gecko (Hemidactylus robustus) is a species of geckos, family Gekkonidae, found in northeastern Africa and in the Middle East.

Distribution 
It may be found in Egypt, Sudan, Eritrea, Ethiopia, Somalia, Kenya, Yemen, Oman, Qatar, Iraq, Iran, Saudi Arabia, United Arab Emirates and Pakistan.

Conservation status 
In Egypt, it is expected to lose much of its currently suitable distribution in the future due to anthropogenic climate change.

Original publication 
 Heyden, 1827 : Atlas zu der Reise im nördlichen Afrika. I. Zoologie. Reptilien. H. L. Brönner, p. 1-24 (integrated text).

References 

Hemidactylus
Reptiles described in 1827
Taxa named by Carl von Heyden
Reptiles of the Middle East
Reptiles of North Africa
Vertebrates of Egypt
Vertebrates of Eritrea
Reptiles of Ethiopia
Reptiles of Iran
Reptiles of Iraq
Reptiles of Kenya
Reptiles of the Arabian Peninsula
Reptiles of Pakistan
Reptiles of Somalia
Vertebrates of Sudan